LGBT parenting (also known as rainbow families) refers to lesbian, gay, bisexual, and transgender (LGBT) people raising one or more children as parents or foster care parents. This includes: children raised by same-sex couples (same-sex parenting), children raised by single LGBT parents, and children raised by an opposite-sex couple where at least one partner is LGBT.

Opponents of LGBT rights have argued that LGBT parenting adversely affects children. However, scientific research consistently shows that gay and lesbian parents are as fit and capable as heterosexual parents, and their children are as psychologically healthy and well-adjusted as those reared by heterosexual parents. Major associations of mental health professionals in the U.S., Canada, and Australia have not identified credible empirical research that suggests otherwise.

Forms

LGBT people can become parents through various means including current or former relationships, coparenting, adoption, foster care, donor insemination, reciprocal IVF, and surrogacy. A gay man, a lesbian, or a transgender person who transitions later in life may have children within an opposite-sex relationship, such as a mixed-orientation marriage, for various reasons.

Some children do not know they have an LGBT parent; coming out issues vary and some parents may never reveal to their children that they identify as LGBT. Accordingly, how children respond to their LGBT parent(s) coming out has little to do with their sexual orientation or gender identification, but rather with how either parent responds to acts of coming out; i.e. whether there is dissolution of parental partnerships or rather if parents maintain a healthy, open, and communicative relationship after coming out or during transition in the case of trans parents.

Many lesbian, gay, bisexual, and transgender people are parents. In the 2000 U.S. Census, for example, 33 percent of female same-sex couple households and 22 percent of male same-sex couple households reported at least one child under the age of 18 living in the home. As of 2005, an estimated 270,313 children in the United States live in households headed by same-sex couples.

Adoption 

Joint adoption by same-sex couples is legal in 27 countries and in some sub-national territories. Furthermore, 5 countries have legalized some form of step-child adoption. Institutional heterosexism can be observed in adoption policies in many parts of the world: some countries or states explicitly prohibit adoption by openly lesbian, gay or bisexual people. Other jurisdictions make decisions about whether LGBTQ people may adopt on a case-by-case basis, with great variability between agencies depending upon the focus of the agency (special needs children, infants, etc.), the religious affiliation of the agency if any, and the disposition of area supervisors and placement workers. There are also legal barriers to international adoptions, since currently no countries which are actively involved in international adoption (e.g. China, Guatemala) permit adoption by openly identified lesbian and gay people. Bisexual, transgender and transsexual people are not typically explicitly named, but are presumably included in these prohibitions.

Judgements 

In 1968, California man Bill Jones became one of the first gay men to adopt a child. He later participated in the gay rights movement with Glide Memorial Church.

Sandy Schuster and Madeleine Isaacson, who met at their Pentecostal church, won America's first custody battle in favor of a lesbian couple in 1978.

In January 2008, the European Court of Human Rights ruled that an otherwise legally qualified and suitable candidate must not be excluded from  adopting based on their sexual orientation.

In 2010 a Florida court declared that "reports and studies find that there are no differences in the parenting of homosexuals or the adjustment of their children", therefore the Court is satisfied that the issue is so far beyond dispute that it would be irrational to hold otherwise.

Fulton v. City of Philadelphia 
Fulton v. City of Philadelphia is a Supreme Court case between Catholic Social Services (CSS) and the city of Philadelphia that took place from November 4, 2020, to June 17, 2021. The city's contracts with adoption agencies prohibit discrimination of LGBTQ couples by law. The city of Philadelphia ended its contract with CSS because the agency refused to consider LGBTQ couples when screening for foster care parents, stating that their actions were due to the religious belief that marriage is between a man and a woman. CSS operates other types of foster care services, like group homes, and received millions of dollars from Philadelphia regardless of the dismissal of their contract. In the court case, CSS claimed that the dismissal of their contract with the city was impeding on their First Amendment right. The lawyer for Philadelphia, Neal Katyal, argued that, "You can't on Monday sign a contract that says we won't discriminate and on Tuesday go ahead and discriminate." The case also aimed to overturn a prior Supreme Court case, Employment Division v. Smith (1990), which concluded that the government's neutral enforcement of a general law is legitimate even if it negatively impacts a religious party. The court ruled that Philadelphia's decision to dismiss the contract violated the rights granted by the Free Exercise Clause of the First Amendment. Despite siding with CSS in Fulton vs. City of Philadelphia, the court did not overturn the 1990 case ruling.

Surrogacy 

Some gay couples decide to have a surrogate pregnancy. A surrogate is a woman (possibly a parent) carrying an egg fertilized by sperm, given by a donor or given by a partner. Some people become surrogates for money, others for humanitarian reasons or both. Parents who use surrogacy services can be stigmatized.

Insemination 

Insemination is a method used mostly by lesbian couples. It is when a partner is fertilised with donor sperm injected through a syringe. Some people who produce sperm donate it for humanitarian reasons, others for money or both. In some countries, the donor can choose to be anonymous (for example in Spain) and in others, they cannot have their identity withheld (United Kingdom).

Reciprocal IVF 

Reciprocal IVF is used by couples who both possess female reproductive organs. Using in vitro fertilization, eggs are removed from one partner to be used to make embryos that the other partner will hopefully carry in a successful pregnancy.

Developing methods 

Currently scientists conduct research on alternative types of human parenthood which can aid same-sex couples to have children. One of the possibilities is obtaining sperm from skin stem cells.

Statistics 

According to U.S. Census Snapshot published in December 2007, same-sex couples with children have significantly fewer economic resources and significantly lower rates of homeownership than heterosexual married couples. A literature review of LGBTQ families' economic well being in the US states that there is also greater food insecurity and less ability to access resources to relieve the effects of poverty among LGBTQ families because of the fear of discrimination. One suggested reason for this is that the majority of LGBTQ couples belong to more than one marginalized group which have lower overall incomes than people in non-marginalized communities.

Data from a survey called the American Community Survey carried out from 2014-2016 estimated that the number of LGBTQ parents raising children in the United States was 114,000. Out of all of the LGBTQ couples in the US, the survey approximated that 24% of female same-sex couples were raising children in comparison to 8% of male same-sex couples. Additionally about 21% of same-sex partners had an adopted child.

A 2014 literature review of 51 surveys of Transgender people in the US found that between one quarter and one half reported being parents with more Trans women being parents than Trans men. In comparison, a 2015 survey of about 27,700 Transgender and Gender Non-conforming people found that 18% reported being a parent to a child. 

An LGBTQ Family Building Survey compiled by an LGBTQ rights coalition called Family Equality found that, in the US, in 2019:63% of LGBTQ Millennials (aged 18-35) are considering expanding their families, either becoming parents for the first time, or by having more children

48% of LGBTQ Millennials are actively planning to grow their families, compared to 55% of non-LGBTQ Millennials, a gap that has narrowed significantly in comparison to older generations

63% of LGBTQ people planning families expect to use assisted reproductive technology, foster care, or adoption to become parents, a significant shift away from older generations of LGBTQ parents for whom the majority of children were conceived through intercourse. A study on the empowerment of LGBTQ couples in Finland found there were 4 factors that contributed to higher feelings of support: 1) Parents' willingness to create socially recognized families, 2) Parenthood support, 3) Respectful partnership with all parents, and 4) Accessible services.According to a 2013–14 survey conducted in Poland by the Institute of Psychology of the Polish Academy of Sciences (IP PAN) on 3000 LGBT people in same-sex relationships living in the country, 9% (11.7% of women and 4.6% of men) of coupled LGBT people were parents. The 2011 Canadian Census had similar conclusions to these of the Polish study: 9.4% of Canadian gay couples were bringing up children.

Research 

Scientific research consistently shows that gay and lesbian parents are as fit and capable as heterosexual parents, and their children are as psychologically healthy and well-adjusted as those reared by heterosexual parents. Major associations of mental health professionals in the U.S., Canada, and Australia have not identified credible empirical research that suggests otherwise.

In the United States, studies on the effect of gay and lesbian parenting on children were first conducted in the 1970s, and expanded through the 1980s in the context of increasing numbers of gay and lesbian parents seeking legal custody of their biological children.

Children and young adults with LGBTQ parents are uniquely defined by the fact that they typically identify as heterosexual, but as a function of their membership in an LGBTQ-parent family, they are exposed to minority stress and experience the effects of adulthood. Thus, a central question in this study is, How do young adults with LGBTQ parents explain their sense of connection to or disconnection from the LGBTQ community, both as children (while growing up with LGBTQ parents) and as young adults?

Regarding the transmission of gender roles, LGBTQ parents are caught between two contrasting images: ‘‘they are portrayed as either inherently different from, or essentially the same as, heterosexual families’’. Lesbians are either seen as a threat to heternormativity because they are militant, anti-male feminists, or as especially safe caregivers because they are two loving, nurturing women, who are unlikely to be sexually abusive. Gay men are also caught between these two contrasting images. On one hand they do not have women’s natural ability to care for children, are perceived as sexually (over)active and potentially predatory and, like lesbians, too political; on the other hand they are more maternal and more feminine than heterosexual men.

The underlying assumption is that gay men and lesbians are different in some essential way from heterosexual people, and this difference implicates their aberrant gender expression. Therefore, they are unable to model appropriate gender behavior to their children, for example, the assumption that gay fathers are unable to bathe their daughters or discuss puberty and menstruation.

Methodology
Studies of LGBT parenting have sometimes suffered from small and/or non-random samples and inability to implement all possible controls, due to the small LGBT parenting population and to cultural and social obstacles to identifying as an LGBT parent.

A 1993 review published in the Journal of Divorce & Remarriage identified fourteen studies addressing the effects of LGBT parenting on children. The review concluded that all of the studies lacked external validity and that therefore: "The conclusion that there are no significant differences in children reared by lesbian mothers versus heterosexual mothers is not supported by the published research database."

Fitzgerald's 1999 analysis explained some methodological difficulties:
Many of these studies suffer from similar limitations and weaknesses, with the main obstacle being the difficulty in acquiring representative, random samples on a virtually invisible population. Many lesbian and gay parents are not open about their sexual orientation due to real fears of discrimination, homophobia, and threats of losing custody of their children. Those who do participate in this type of research are usually relatively open about their homosexuality and, therefore, may bias the research towards a particular group of gay and lesbian parents.

Because of the inevitable use of convenience samples, sample sizes are usually very small and the majority of the research participants end up looking quite homogeneous—e.g. white, middle-class, urban, and well-educated. Another pattern is the wide discrepancy between the number of studies conducted with children of gay fathers and those with lesbian mothers...

Another potential factor of importance is the possibility of social desirability bias when research subjects respond in ways that present themselves and their families in the most desirable light possible. Such a phenomenon does seem possible due to the desire of this population to offset and reverse negative images and discrimination. Consequently, the findings of these studies may be patterned by self-presentation bias.

According to a 2001 review of 21 studies by Stacey and Biblarz published in American Sociological Review: "[R]esearchers lack reliable data on the number and location of lesbigay parents with children in the general population, there are no studies of child development based on random, representative samples of such families. Most studies rely on small-scale, snowball and convenience samples were drawn primarily from personal and community networks or agencies. Most research to date has been conducted on white lesbian mothers who are comparatively educated, mature, and reside in relatively progressive urban centers, most often in California or the Northeastern states."

In more recent studies, many of these issues have been resolved due to factors such as the changing social climate for LGBT people.

Herek's 2006 paper in American Psychologist stated:

The overall methodological sophistication and quality of studies in this domain have increased over the years, as would be expected for any new area of empirical inquiry. More recent research has reported data from probability and community-based convenience samples, has used more rigorous assessment techniques, and has been published in highly respected and widely cited developmental psychology journals, including Child Development and Developmental Psychology. Data are increasingly available from prospective studies. In addition, whereas early study samples consisted mainly of children originally born into heterosexual relationships that subsequently dissolved when one parent came out as gay or lesbian, recent samples are more likely to include children conceived within a same-sex relationship or adopted in infancy by a same-sex couple. Thus, they are less likely to confound the effects of having a sexual minority parent with the consequences of divorce.

A 2002 review of the literature identified 20 studies examining outcomes among children raised by gay or lesbian parents and found that these children did not systematically differ from those raised by heterosexual parents on any of the studied outcomes.

In a 2009 affidavit filed in the case Gill v. Office of Personnel Management, Michael Lamb, a professor of psychology and head of Department of Social and Developmental Psychology at Cambridge University, stated:
The methodologies used in the major studies of same-sex parenting meet the standards for research in the field of developmental psychology and psychology generally. The studies specific to same-sex parenting were published in leading journals in the field of child and adolescent development, such as Child Development, published by the Society for Research in Child Development, Developmental Psychology, published by the American Psychological Association, and The Journal of Child Psychology and Psychiatry, the flagship peer-review journals in the field of child development. Most of the studies appeared in these (or similar) rigorously peer-reviewed and highly selective journals, whose standards represent expert consensus on generally accepted social scientific standards for research on child and adolescent development. Prior to publication in these journals, these studies were required to go through a rigorous peer-review process, and as a result, they constitute the type of research that members of the respective professions consider reliable. The body of research on same-sex families is consistent with standards in the relevant fields and produces reliable conclusions."

Gartrell and Bos's 25-year longitudinal study, published 2010, was limited to mothers who sought donor insemination and who may have been more motivated than mothers in other circumstances.  Gartrell and Bos note that the study's limitations included utilizing a non-random sample, and the lesbian group and control group were not matched for race or area of residence.

Michael J. Rosenfeld, associate professor of sociology at Stanford University, wrote in a 2010 study published in Demography that "[A] critique of the literature—that the sample sizes of the studies are too small to allow for statistically powerful tests—continues to be relevant." Rosenfeld's study, "the first to use large-sample nationally representative data," found that children of same-sex couples demonstrated normal outcomes in school. "The core finding here," reports the study," offers a measure of validation for the prior, and much-debated, small-sample studies."

According to a 2005 brief by the American Psychological Association:

In 2010 American Psychological Association, The California Psychological Association, The American Psychiatric Association, and the American Association for Marriage and Family Therapy stated:

A significant increase in methodological rigor was achieved in a 2020 study by Deni Mazrekaj at University of Oxford, Kristof De Witte and Sofie Cabus at KU Leuven published in the American Sociological Review. The authors used administrative longitudinal data on the entire population of children born between 1998 and 2007 in the Netherlands, which was the first country to legalize same-sex marriage. They followed the educational performance of 2,971 children with same-sex parents and over a million children with different-sex parents from birth. This was the first study to address how children who were actually raised by same-sex parents from birth (instead of happening to live with a same-sex couple at some point in time) perform in school while retaining a large representative sample. The authors found that children raised by same-sex parents from birth perform better than children raised by different-sex parents in both primary and secondary education. According to the authors, a major factor explaining these results was parental socioeconomic status. Same-sex couples often have to use expensive fertility treatments and adoption procedures to have a child, meaning they tend to be wealthier, older and more educated than the typical different-sex couple. However, the study concluded that the positive effects of being raised by same-sex parents still remained after controlling for socioeconomic status, though they did lessen. The authors hypothesize that homophobic discrimination could cause same-sex parents to compensate by investing more time and energy into their children.

Consensus 
Scientific research that has directly compared outcomes for children with gay and lesbian parents with outcomes for children with heterosexual parents has found that children raised by same-sex couples are as physically or psychologically healthy, capable, and successful as those raised by opposite-sex couples, despite the reality that considerable legal discrimination and inequity remain significant challenges for these families. Major associations of mental health professionals in the U.S., Canada, and Australia, have not identified credible empirical research that suggests otherwise. Sociologist Wendy Manning echoes their conclusion that "[The] studies reveal that children raised in same-sex parent families fare just as well as children raised in different-sex parent families across a wide spectrum of child well-being measures: academic performance, cognitive development, social development, psychological health, early sexual activity, and substance abuse." The range of these studies allows for conclusions to be drawn beyond any narrow spectrum of a child's well-being, and the literature further indicates that parents' financial, psychological and physical well-being is enhanced by marriage and that children benefit from being raised by two parents within a legally recognized union. There is evidence that nuclear families with homosexual parents are more egalitarian in their distribution of home and childcare activities, and thus less likely to embrace traditional gender roles. Nonetheless, the American Academy of Pediatrics reports that there are no differences in the interests and hobbies between children with homosexual versus heterosexual parents.

Since the 1970s, it has become increasingly clear that it is family processes (such as the quality of parenting, the psychosocial well-being of parents, the quality of and satisfaction with relationships within the family, and the level of co-operation and harmony between parents) that contribute to determining children's well-being and outcomes rather than family structures, per se, such as the number, gender, sexuality and cohabitation status of parents. Since the end of the 1980s, as a result, it has been well established that children and adolescents can be as well-adjusted in nontraditional settings as in traditional settings. Furthermore, whereas factors such as the number and cohabitation status of parents can and do influence relationship quality in aggregate, the same has not been demonstrated for sexuality. According to sociologist Judith Stacey of New York University, "Rarely is there as much consensus in any area of social science as in the case of gay parenting, which is why the American Academy of Pediatrics and all of the major professional organizations with expertise in child welfare have issued reports and resolutions in support of gay and lesbian parental rights". These organizations include the American Academy of Pediatrics, the American Academy of Child and Adolescent Psychiatry, the American Psychiatric Association, the American Psychological Association, the American Association for Marriage and Family Therapy,  the American Psychoanalytic Association, the National Association of Social Workers, the Child Welfare League of America, the North American Council on Adoptable Children, and Canadian Psychological Association.  In 2006, Gregory M. Herek stated in American Psychologist: "If gay, lesbian, or bisexual parents were inherently less capable than otherwise comparable heterosexual parents, their children would evidence problems regardless of the type of sample. This pattern clearly has not been observed. Given the consistent failures in this research literature to disprove the null hypothesis, the burden of empirical proof is on those who argue that the children of sexual minority parents fare worse than the children of heterosexual parents."

Studies and analyses include Bridget Fitzgerald's 1999 analysis of the research on gay and lesbian parenting, published in Marriage & Family Review, which found that the available studies generally concluded that "the sexual orientation of parents is not an effective or important predictor of successful childhood development" and Gregory M. Herek's 2006 analysis in American Psychologist, which said: "Despite considerable variation in the quality of their samples, research design, measurement methods, and data analysis techniques, the findings to date have been remarkably consistent. Empirical studies comparing children raised by sexual minority parents with those raised by otherwise comparable heterosexual parents have not found reliable disparities in mental health or social adjustment. Differences have not been found in parenting ability between lesbian mothers and heterosexual mothers. Studies examining gay fathers are fewer in number but do not show that gay men are any less fit or able as parents than heterosexual men." Additionally, some fear that children will inherit their parent's gender dysphoria or alternate mental health issues in the case of trans parent, yet there is research that suggests "an absence of evidence that children raised by transgendered parents have a greater chance of experiencing […] development issues than raised by non-transgender parents" and further clinical research shows that "children of gender-variant parents do not develop gender dysphoria or mental diseases" due to their parents' diagnosis with gender identity disorder  A 1996 meta-analysis found "no differences on any measures between the heterosexual and homosexual parents regarding parenting styles, emotional adjustment, and sexual orientation of the child(ren)"; and a 2008 meta-analysis reached similar conclusions.

In June 2010, the results of a 25-year ongoing longitudinal study by Nanette Gartrell of the University of California and Henny Bos of the University of Amsterdam were released. Gartrell and Bos studied 78 children conceived through donor insemination and raised by lesbian mothers. Mothers were interviewed and given clinical questionnaires during pregnancy and when their children were 2, 5, 10, and 17 years of age. In the abstract of the report, the authors stated: "According to their mothers' reports, the 17-year-old daughters and sons of lesbian mothers were rated significantly higher in social, school/academic, and total competence and significantly lower in social problems, rule-breaking, aggressive, and externalizing problem behavior than their age-matched counterparts in Achenbach's normative sample of American youth."

Analysis of extensive social science literature into the question of children's psychological outcomes of being raised by same-sex parents by the Australian Institute of Family Studies in 2013 concluded that "there is now strong evidence that same-sex parented families constitute supportive environments in which to raise children" and that with regard to lesbian parenting "...clear benefits appear to exist with regard to: the quality of parenting children experience in comparison to their peers parented in heterosexual couple families; children's and young adults' greater tolerance of sexual and gender diversity; and gender flexibility displayed by children, particularly sons."

Sexual orientation and gender role 
Reviews of data from studies thus far suggest that children reared by non-heterosexual parents have outcomes similar to those of children reared by heterosexual parents with respect to sexual orientation. According to the U.S. Census, 80% of the children being raised by same-sex couples in the United States are their biological children. Regarding biological children of non-heterosexuals, a 2016 review lead by J. Michael Bailey states "We would expect, for example, that homosexual parents should be more likely than heterosexual parents to have homosexual children on the basis of genetics alone", since there is some genetic contribution to sexual orientation, and parents and children share 50 percent of their genes.

Important observations from research on twins separated at birth and large adoption studies, is that parents tend to have little to no environmental effects on their children's behavioural traits, which are instead correlated with genes shared between parent and child and the non-shared environment (environment which is unique to the child, such as random developmental noise and events, as opposed to rearing). The 2016 Bailey et al. review concludes that there "is good evidence for both genetic and nonsocial environmental influences on sexual orientation" including prenatal developmental events, but that there is better evidence for biological mechanisms relating to male sexual orientation, which appears unresponsive to socialization, saying "we would be surprised if differences in social environment contributed to differences in male sexual orientation at all." In contrast, they say that female sexual orientation may be somewhat responsive to social environment, saying "it would also be less surprising to us to discover that social environment affects female sexual orientation and related behavior, that possibility must be scientifically supported rather than assumed."

A 2013 statement from the American Academy of Child and Adolescent Psychiatry states that children of LGBT parents do not have any differences in their gender role behaviors in comparison to those observed in heterosexual family structures.

A 2005 review by Charlotte J. Patterson for the American Psychological Association found that the available data did not suggest higher rates of homosexuality among the children of lesbian or gay parents. Herek's 2006 review describes the available data on the point as limited. Stacey and Biblarz and Herek stress that the sexual orientation and gender identification of children is of limited relevance to discussions of parental fitness or policies based on the same. In a 2010 review comparing single-father families with other family types, Stacey and Biblarz state, "We know very little yet about how parents influence the development of their children's sexual identities or how these intersect with gender." When it comes to family socialization processes and "contextual effects," Stacey and Biblarz say that children with such parents are more likely to grow up in relatively more tolerant school, neighborhood, and social contexts.

Social challenges and support systems 

Children may struggle with negative attitudes about their parents from the harassment they may encounter by living in society. There are many risks and challenges that can occur for children of LGBT families and their parents in North America, including those in the individual domain, family domain, and community/school domain. Hegemonic social norms can lead some children to struggle in all or several domains. Social interactions at school, extracurricular activities, and religious organizations can promote negative attitudes towards their parents and themselves based on gender and sexuality. Bias, stereotypes, micro-aggressions, harm, and violence that both students and parents can often encounter are a result of identifying outside of social normative, cis-gender, heterosexual society or having their identity used as a weapon against them.

The forms of harm and violence that LGBT young people can experience include physical harm and harassment, cyber harassment, assault, bullying, micro-aggressions and beyond. Due to the increased risk of harm experienced, children of LGBT parents and LGBT students can also experience increased levels of stress, anxiety, and self-esteem issues. Several legal and social protections support children and parents who experience transphobia and homophobia in the community, school, and family. Practicing and developing supportive networks within schools and working towards resilience skills can assist in creating safe environments for students and parents. Social supports, ally development, and positive school environments are direct ways to challenge homophobia and transphobia directed at these students and their families. Several networks and school clubs can be set up and led by student youth to create positive school environments and community environments for LGBT students and their families. Organizations such as Gay-Straight Alliance Network (GSA), American Civil Liberties Union(ACLU), and Gay, Lesbian, and Straight Education Network (GLSEN) can assist in supportive school environments. Community resources for LGBT children and parents such as the Human Rights Campaign (HRC), The Trevor Project, and Parents, Families, and Friends of Lesbians and Gays (PFLAG) can assist in building personal support systems.

Other 
Stephen Hicks, a reader in health and social care at the University of Salford questions the value of trying to establish that lesbian or gay parents are defective or suitable. He argues such positions are flawed because they are informed by ideologies that either oppose or support such families. In Hicks' view:

Misrepresentation by opponents 
In a 2006 statement, the Canadian Psychological Association released an updated statement on their 2003 and 2005 conclusions, saying, "The CPA recognizes and appreciates that persons and institutions are entitled to their opinions and positions on this issue. However, CPA is concerned that some persons and institutions are misinterpreting the findings of psychological research to support their positions when their positions are more accurately based on other systems of belief or values." Several professional organizations have noted that studies which opponents of LGBT parenting claim as evidence that same-sex couples are unfit parents do not in fact address same-sex parenting, however, and therefore do not permit any conclusions to be drawn about the effects of the sexes or sexual orientations of parents. Rather, these studies, which only sampled heterosexual parents, found that it was better for children to be raised by two parents instead of one, and/or that the divorce or death of a parent had a negative effect on children. In Perry v. Brown, in which Judge Vaughn Walker found that the available studies on stepchildren, which opponents of same-sex marriage cited to support their position that it is best for a child to be raised by its biological mother and father, do not isolate "the genetic relationship between a parent and a child as a variable to be tested" and only compare "children raised by married, biological parents with children raised by single parents, unmarried mothers, step families and cohabiting parents," and thus "compare various family structures and do not emphasize biology."  Perry also cited studies showing that "adopted children or children conceived using sperm or egg donors are just as likely to be well-adjusted as children raised by their biological parents."

Gregory M. Herek noted in 2006 that "empirical research can't reconcile disputes about core values, but it is very good at addressing questions of fact. Policy debates will be impoverished if this important source of knowledge is simply dismissed as a 'he said, she said' squabble."

Other aspects

Marriage

Same-sex parenting is often raised as an issue in debates about the recognition of same-sex marriage by law.

Trans parenting

There is little to no visibility or public support through pregnancy and parenting resources directed towards trans parents.

Transgender parents, like cisgender and/or heterosexual parents, can have children in a number of ways, such as biological gestation, adoption, surrogacy, and with biomedical interventions. Trans parents often face different barriers to parenthood than non-trans parents, much of which has to do with the societal expectations of what parents look like.

While "once gay and lesbian parents attain parenthood status[…] they almost never lose it" this is not the case for trans parents, as seen with the cases of Suzanne Daly (1983) and Martha Boyd (2007), two trans women who both had their parental rights, with regard to biological children, terminated on the basis of their diagnosis of gender identity disorder and their trans status. They were perceived to have abandoned their role as "fathers" through their MTF transition, and were perceived to have acted selfishly in putting their own sexual/identity needs before the wellbeing of their children. These cases are amongst many legal custody battles fought by trans parents whereby U.S. courts have completely overlooked defendants' suitability as "parents" as opposed to "mothers" or "fathers," roles that are heavily gendered and come with strict societal understandings of normative parental behaviour. In the case of trans individuals who desire to become parents and to be legally recognized as mothers or fathers of their children, courts often refuse to legally acknowledge such roles because of biological discrimination. An example of this is the X, Y and Z vs. U.K case, whereby X, a trans man who had been in a stable relationship with Y, a biological woman who gave birth to Z through artificial insemination through which X was always present, was denied the right to be listed as Z's father on their birth certificate due to the fact that they did not directly inseminate Y.

Recently, Canada has started acknowledging trans parental rights in terms of custody arrangements and of legal recognition of parental status. In 2001, a trans woman was permitted to retain custody of her daughter after her ex-partner filed for sole custody on the basis of her transition. The courts ruled that "the applicant's transsexuality, in itself, without further evidence, would not constitute a material change in circumstances, nor would it be considered a negative factor in a custody determination", marking a landmark case in family law whereby "a person's transsexuality is irrelevant on its own as a factor in his or her ability to be a good parent". Additionally, a resident trans man from Toronto, Canada "was permitted to identify as [the child's] father on the province of Ontario's Statement of Live Birth Form", marking a decoupling of genetics and bio-sex in relation to parental roles.

Stressors for trans parents 

Transgender families can experience unique social pressure. Consequently, transgender parents may experience stressors or barriers relating to their gender transition, which can have an impact on their overall family dynamics and can influence outcomes for transgender people. Many trans individuals cite, since their younger years, not wanting to have children or become pregnant due to the body and gender dysphoria that accompanies childbearing. This relates back toward a large problem for trans individuals even in a non-parenting context, because much of how society views gender does not leave a space for trans individuals. Additionally, a sense of support, especially from family, was found to be an important factor for coping with stressors in a study from 2014. It revealed that 43% of participants stated that they mostly depended on their children for support to help their coping with stress related to their gender transition, while 29% named their partner as their most important support. A 2016 study examined how potential stressors for families, access to resources, and the trans parent's perceptions impact how the family functions. The functioning of the family refers to their ability to handle stress and in turn, their ability to steer clear of crisis situations. The study's findings indicate that experience of stigma surrounding transgender identities, uncertainty of their role or status of acceptance in their families following gender transition, and sense of coherence had the most profound impact on family functioning. Sense of Coherence refers to viewing one's environment as "comprehensible, manageable, and meaningful." Experiencing stigma, as well as uncertainty of their acceptance within their families, were found to contribute to lower satisfaction in family functioning. The study also found that negative effects of stigma can be offset by a strong sense of coherence, while satisfaction in the family's functioning can be strengthened by a strong sense of coherence.

When stigma is reduced around trans parenting, such as from supportive family, adoption staff, and healthcare professionals, trans people can more easily find satisfaction and a positive family functioning.

See also
Social
Coparenting
LGBT reproduction
LGBT adoption
LGBT adoption in Europe
LGBT youth vulnerability
Marriage promotion
Same-sex marriage and the family
Surrogacy
Third party reproduction
Medical:
Artificial insemination
Assisted reproductive technology
In vitro fertilisation
Shared parenting
Sperm donation
Parenting
Publications
Oh the Things Mommies Do! What Could Be Better Than Having Two?, a 2009 children's book.
Research:
 New Family Structures Study: Published by Mark Regnerus in 2012, this study was widely discredited by researchers, and which claimed to show that children of gay and lesbian parents were adversely affected by their upbringing by parents in same-sex relationships.
Homosexual parenting in animals

References

Further reading

External links

 Lesbian, Gay, Bisexual and Transgender (LGBT) Parented Families – A Literature Review prepared for The Australian Psychological Society  (2007)
 Too High a Price – The Case Against Restricting Gay Parenting (updated second edition) (2006), a publication by the ACLU, includes a detailed review of studies and research.
 American Psychological Association (APA) Public Interest Directorate: Research Summary on Lesbian and Gay Parenting (2005)
 Brief presented to the Legislative House of Commons Committee on Bill C38 By the Canadian Psychological Association (2005)
 Lesbian and Gay Parents and Their Children: Research on the Family Life Cycle

 
Family law
Parenting
LGBT and society